Kenny Kirkland is the debut solo album by pianist Kenny Kirkland.

Track listing
All tracks composed by Kenny Kirkland, except where noted.

"Mr. J. C." - 8:07
"Midnight Silence" - 3:32
"El Rey" (Jeff "Tain" Watts) - 1:35
"Steepian Faith" - 6:03
"Celia" (Bud Powell) - 6:49
"Chance" - 6:01
"When Will The Blues Leave" (Ornette Coleman) - 5:39
"Ana Maria" (Wayne Shorter) - 8:36
"Revelations" - 7:48
"Criss Cross" (Thelonious Monk) - 5:19
"Blasphemy" - 3:04

Personnel
Kenny Kirkland - piano (all but 3 & 5), keyboards (track 5, 11)
Branford Marsalis - tenor saxophone (1, 10), soprano saxophone (2, 4, 9)
Jeff "Tain" Watts - drums (1-4, 6, 7, 9)
Steve Berrios - drums (8, 10)
Don Alias - percussion (5, 11), bongos (8)
Jerry Gonzales - percussion (8, 10)
Roderick Ward - alto saxophone (7)
Andy Gonzalez - bass (8, 10)
Charnett Moffett - bass (1, 4, 7)
Christian McBride  - bass (6)

References 

1991 debut albums
GRP Records albums